The Long Eddy Point Lighthouse (also known as The Whistle) is a Canadian lighthouse on Grand Manan Island in the Bay of Fundy. The navigation station was first established in 1874 as a fog alarm only and operated as such until 1966, when the present structure was built incorporating a lighthouse. The building has been designated a heritage lighthouse under Canada's Heritage Lighthouse Protection Act.

History
In 1874 a steam-powered fog whistle was built at Long Eddy Point, a tree-covered cliff at the northern end of Grand Manan. It began operation on 1 July 1874. It emitted 3 blasts, four seconds long, every minute. The station's infrastructure included a keeper's house, a coal shed, storage tanks for the water used to generate the steam for the whistle, and a wharf at the bottom of the cliff for delivering supplies to the keeper. In 1893 and 1897 wooden abutments were built to protect the station from falling rocks and other material.

In 1905 a new fog alarm building was constructed on the beach below the original station. It began operation on 15 January 1905 with a diaphone foghorn replacing the steam whistle. In 1948 a new keeper's dwelling was built at the top of the cliff near the present lighthouse. The present building, combining a fog alarm and a lighthouse, was constructed in 1966 at the top of the cliff. The station was automated and de-staffed in 1989.

The Long Eddy Point Lighthouse is also known as "The Whistle", which was the nickname given to the original 1874 steam whistle.

Heritage designation
The Long Eddy Point Lighthouse has been recognized under Canada's Heritage Lighthouse Protection Act. The building will become the property of the Village of Grand Manan and The Swallowtail Keepers Society, which looks after the Swallowtail Lighthouse, will manage  the property.

See also
 List of lighthouses in New Brunswick
 List of lighthouses in Canada

References

External links
 Aids to Navigation Canadian Coast Guard

Lighthouses in New Brunswick
Buildings and structures in Charlotte County, New Brunswick